The 2017–18 Oregon Ducks men's basketball team represented the University of Oregon during the 2017–18 NCAA Division I men's basketball season. The Ducks, led by eighth-year head coach Dana Altman, played their home games at Matthew Knight Arena as members of the Pac–12 Conference. They finished the season 23–13, 10–8 in Pac-12 play to finish in a tie for sixth place. As the No. 6 seed in the Pac-12 tournament, they defeated Washington State in the first round and Utah in the quarterfinals before being defeated by USC in the semifinals. They received an invitation to the National Invitation Tournament, where they defeated Rider in the first round before losing to Marquette in the second round.

Previous season

The Ducks finished the 2016–17 season 33–6, 16–2 in Pac-12 play to win a share of the regular season Pac-12 championship. They defeated Arizona State and California in the Pac-12 tournament before losing in the final to Arizona. They received an at-large bid to the NCAA tournament as a No. 3 seed in the Midwest Region where they defeated Iona and Rhode Island to advance to the Sweet Sixteen. In the Sweet Sixteen, they defeated Michigan to advance to the Elite Eight where they defeated Kansas. The win marked the first time the Ducks advanced to the Final Four since 1939. There, they lost to the eventual champions, North Carolina.

Off-season

Departures

Incoming transfers

2017 recruiting class

Roster

Schedule and results

|-
!colspan=12 style=| Exhibition

|-
!colspan=12 style=| Non-conference regular season

|-
!colspan=12 style=| Pac-12 regular season

|-
!colspan=12 style=| Pac-12 Tournament

|-

|-

|-
!colspan=12 style=| NIT

References

Oregon Ducks men's basketball seasons
Oregon
2017 in sports in Oregon
Oregon Ducks men's basketball
Oregon